Arthur Hugh Smith-Barry, 1st Baron Barrymore,  (17 January 1843 – 22 February 1925), was an Anglo-Irish Conservative politician.

Background and education
Smith-Barry was the son of James Hugh Smith Barry, of Marbury, Cheshire, and Fota Island, County Cork, and his wife Eliza, daughter of Shallcross Jacson. His paternal grandfather John Smith Barry was the illegitimate son of James Hugh Smith Barry, son of John Smith Barry, younger son of Lieutenant-General The 4th Earl of Barrymore (a title which had become extinct in 1823; see Earl of Barrymore). He was educated at Eton and Christ Church, Oxford.

Political career
Smith-Barry entered Parliament as one of two representatives for County Cork in 1867, a seat he held until 1874. Smith-Barry remained out of the House of Commons for the next twelve years but returned in 1886 when he was elected for Huntingdon, and represented this constituency until 1900. He was also High Sheriff of County Cork in 1886 and was tasked by Arthur Balfour to organise landlord resistance to the tenant Plan of Campaign movement of the late 1880s. He was sworn of the Privy Council of Ireland in 1896. It was announced in the 1902 Coronation Honours list that he would be created a peer, and the Barrymore title held by his ancestors was partially revived when he was raised to the peerage as Baron Barrymore, of Barrymore in the County of Cork, on 24 July 1902. He took his seat in the House of Lords a couple of days later.

Cricket
Smith-Barry played two first-class cricket matches for the Marylebone Cricket Club, playing once in 1873 and once in 1875.

Family
Lord Barrymore married firstly Lady Mary Frances, daughter of The 3rd Earl of Dunraven and Mount-Earl, in 1868. Their children were:
 Geraldine Smith-Barry, born 9 Jun 1869 at 26 Chesham Place in London, died 23 Dec 1957
 James Hugh Smith-Barry, born 22 Oct 1870 on Fota Island, died 18 May 1871

After his wife's death on 11 Sep 1884 (in Bex, Switzerland). He then married Elizabeth, daughter of U.S. General James S. Wadsworth and widow of Arthur Post, on 28 Feb 1889. They had one child together:
 Dorothy Elizabeth Smith-Barry, born 14 Apr 1894, d. 16 Jan 1975

Lord Barrymore died in London in February 1925, aged 82, and was cremated at Golders Green Crematorium. His only son James had died as an infant in 1871 and consequently the barony became extinct on Barrymore's death. Lady Barrymore died on 9 May 1930 in London.

On the death of Arthur Hugh Smith Barry in 1925, the estate, which was entailed, passed to his brother, James Hugh Smith Barry. On his death, it passed to James Hugh's son, Robert Raymond Smith-Barry. In 1939, the estate of Fota Island and the ground rents of areas was acquired by Arthur Hugh's daughter (from her cousin), Mrs. Dorothy Bell, for the sum of £31,000. On her death, in 1975, it passed to her daughter, Mrs. Rosemary Villiers, and Fota House is now the property of The Irish Heritage Trust.

Arms

See also
Earl of Barrymore

References

External links

 

fotahouse.com

1843 births
1925 deaths
People educated at Eton College
Barons in the Peerage of the United Kingdom
Members of the Parliament of the United Kingdom for County Cork constituencies (1801–1922)
UK MPs 1865–1868
UK MPs 1868–1874
UK MPs 1886–1892
UK MPs 1892–1895
UK MPs 1895–1900
UK MPs who were granted peerages
Conservative Party (UK) MPs for English constituencies
Members of the Privy Council of Ireland
Irish Conservative Party MPs
Arthur
High Sheriffs of County Cork
Directors of the Great Western Railway
English cricketers
Marylebone Cricket Club cricketers
Peers created by Edward VII